Gyula Király (born 28 October 1908) was a Hungarian international football player. He played for the club BKV Előre SC. He participated with the Hungary national football team at the 1936 Summer Olympics in Berlin.

References

External links

1908 births
Footballers at the 1936 Summer Olympics
Olympic footballers of Hungary
Hungarian footballers
Year of death missing
Association football midfielders
BKV Előre SC footballers